Moraine Airpark  is a public-use airport situated in the city of Moraine, Ohio, United States.  southwest of the city of Dayton in Montgomery County.

Facilities and aircraft 

For the 12-month period ending May 9, 2007, the airport had 87,263 aircraft operations, an average of 239 per day: 94% general aviation, 6% air taxi and <1% military. There are 121 aircraft based at this airport: 95% single-engine, 4% multi-engine and 1% glider.

References

External links 

Airports in Ohio
Transportation in Montgomery County, Ohio
Buildings and structures in Montgomery County, Ohio